Stephen 'Steve' Harris (born 1975) is a Welsh international lawn and indoor bowler.

Bowls career
Harris bowls for RTB Ebbw Vale B.C (outdoors) and Blaenau Gwent (indoors) and was selected for the Welsh team for the 2016 World Outdoor Bowls Championship in Avonhead, Christchurch, New Zealand and the 2018 Commonwealth Games on the Gold Coast in Queensland, Australia.

He is a triples National Champion, bowling for the RTB Ebbw Vale and three times a runner-up in the singles.

In 2015 he won the triples silver medal and fours bronze medal at the Atlantic Bowls Championships. In 2019 he won the fours bronze medal at the Atlantic Bowls Championships and in 2020 he was selected for the 2020 World Outdoor Bowls Championship in Australia.

References 

Welsh male bowls players
Bowls players at the 2018 Commonwealth Games
Living people
1975 births
Commonwealth Games competitors for Wales